Grande-Rivière (literally Great River) is a city in the Gaspésie-Îles-de-la-Madeleine region of the province of Québec in Canada.

In addition to Grande-Rivière itself, the town's territory also includes the communities of Grande-Rivière-Ouest, Petite-Rivière-Ouest, and Petit Pabos.

Demographics 

Attractions

L'Église de Notre-Dame-de-l'Assomption is a large Roman Catholic church with 1.500 seats which was completed in 1893. The church has a Casavant organ dating from 1954.

See also
 List of cities in Quebec

References

Cities and towns in Quebec
Incorporated places in Gaspésie–Îles-de-la-Madeleine